Tangled Up in Blue is a song by American musician Bob Dylan.

Tangled Up in Blue may also refer to: 

Tangled Up in Blue: Blue Labour and the Struggle for Labour's Soul, a 2011 book by Rowenna Davis
Tangled Up in Blue: Policing the American City, a 2021 book by Rosa Brooks
"Tangled Up in Blue", a 2018 episode of the American television show The Conners

See also
Tangled Up in Blues, a 1999 album of covers of Bob Dylan songs